is a Japanese manga series written and illustrated by Seita Horio. It has been serialized in Kodansha's seinen manga magazine Monthly Morning Two since October 2015.

Publication
Written and illustrated by Seita Horio, Golden Gold started in Kodansha's seinen manga magazine  on October 22, 2015. Kodansha has collected its chapters into individual tankōbon volumes. The first volume was released on June 23, 2016. As of November 22, 2021, nine volumes have been released.

In North America, the manga is licensed digitally by Kodansha USA, with the first volume releasing on June 14, 2022.

Volume list

Reception
The series ranked first in the August 2016 edition of Takarajimasha's Kono Manga ga Sugoi! Web; the series ranked #5 on Kono Manga ga Sugoi! top 20 manga for male readers. Golden Gold was nominated for the 10th Manga Taishō in 2017 and ranked #7 with 42 points; it was nominated for the 11th edition in 2018 and ranked #12 with 13 points; it was nominated for the 12th edition in 2019 and ranked #12 with 22 points.

See also
Kokkoku, another manga series by the same author

References

Further reading

External links
 

Drama anime and manga
Horror anime and manga
Kodansha manga
Seinen manga
Supernatural anime and manga